Beorn Nijenhuis (born 2 April 1984) is a Dutch speed skater, who represented the Netherlands at the 2006 Winter Olympics.

Born in Canada, where he started speed skating, he eventually moved to the Netherlands at the age of 13. A year later he received his Dutch citizenship, and started competing for them soon after.

He has been a standout in the men's 1000m on the international scene, ranking second in the Speed Skating World Cup standings and finishing fifth at the 2005 World Single Distance Championships. He was third in the final 1500m World Cup rankings.  He was national record holder in the 1000 meter from 2008 to 2012.

The Torino Olympics was his first appearance at the Olympics. He finished 35th in the 500 metres and 12th in the 1000 meters.

Personal records

Nijenhuis has an Adelskalender score of 155.350 points

World records established

Source:

Tournament overview

 DNF = Did not finish
 DQ = Disqualified

Medals won

References

External links 
Bio at NBCOlympics.com
Photos of Beorn Nijenhuis

1984 births
Living people
Dutch male speed skaters
Canadian people of Dutch descent
Canadian emigrants to the Netherlands
Olympic speed skaters of the Netherlands
People from Clearwater County, Alberta
People with acquired Dutch citizenship
Speed skaters at the 2006 Winter Olympics
Sportspeople from Alberta